= Greve Prize =

German scientific research award

The Greve Prize of the German National Academy of Sciences Leopoldina honors outstanding research achievements since 2022. The prize is financed by the "Foundation for Science and Culture Helmut and Hannelore Greve". The award is endowed with €250,000 and is awarded every two years in Hamburg.

== Recipients ==
- 2022 Kerstin Volz (University of Marburg) and Jürgen Janek (University of Giessen) for basic research on rechargeable high-performance batteries
